Squirrel Mountain Valley is a census-designated place (CDP) in the southern Sierra Nevadas, in Kern County, California, United States. The population was 547 at the 2010 census, up from 498 at the 2000 census.

Geography

Demographics

2010
At the 2010 census Squirrel Mountain Valley had a population of 547. The racial makeup of Squirrel Mountain Valley was 509 (93.1%) White, 2 (0.4%) African American, 9 (1.6%) Native American, 1 (0.2%) Asian, 0 (0.0%) Pacific Islander, 13 (2.4%) from other races, and 13 (2.4%) from two or more races. Hispanic or Latino of any race were 22 people (4.0%).

The whole population lived in households, no one lived in non-institutionalized group quarters and no one was institutionalized.

There were 255 households, 38 (14.9%) had children under the age of 18 living in them, 162 (63.5%) were opposite-sex married couples living together, 9 (3.5%) had a female householder with no husband present, 13 (5.1%) had a male householder with no wife present.  There were 5 (2.0%) unmarried opposite-sex partnerships, and 2 (0.8%) same-sex married couples or partnerships. 63 households (24.7%) were one person and 43 (16.9%) had someone living alone who was 65 or older. The average household size was 2.15.  There were 184 families (72.2% of households); the average family size was 2.51.

The age distribution was 68 people (12.4%) under the age of 18, 22 people (4.0%) aged 18 to 24, 58 people (10.6%) aged 25 to 44, 209 people (38.2%) aged 45 to 64, and 190 people (34.7%) who were 65 or older.  The median age was 58.3 years. For every 100 females, there were 104.1 males.  For every 100 females age 18 and over, there were 99.6 males.

There were 304 housing units at an average density of 426.1 per square mile, of the occupied units 230 (90.2%) were owner-occupied and 25 (9.8%) were rented. The homeowner vacancy rate was 3.4%; the rental vacancy rate was 16.7%.  488 people (89.2% of the population) lived in owner-occupied housing units and 59 people (10.8%) lived in rental housing units.

2000
At the 2000 census there were 498 people, 218 households, and 165 families living in the CDP. The racial makeup of the CDP was 93.17% White, 0.40% Black or African American, 0.80% Native American, 0.20% Pacific Islander, 1.61% from other races, and 3.82% from two or more races.  5.42% of the population were Hispanic or Latino of any race.
Of the 218 households 19.7% had children under the age of 18 living with them, 69.3% were married couples living together, 3.2% had a female householder with no husband present, and 23.9% were non-families. 22.5% of households were one person and 16.1% were one person aged 65 or older.  The average household size was 2.28 and the average family size was 2.64.

The age distribution was 17.9% under the age of 18, 2.8% from 18 to 24, 13.9% from 25 to 44, 30.5% from 45 to 64, and 34.9% 65 or older.  The median age was 54 years. For every 100 females, there were 100.0 males.  For every 100 females age 18 and over, there were 96.6 males.

The median household income was $42,083 and the median family income  was $52,875. Males had a median income of $62,656 versus $49,000 for females. The per capita income for the CDP was $31,909.  None of the families and 2.5% of the population were living below the poverty line, including no under eighteens and 5.8% of those over 64.

References

Census-designated places in Kern County, California
Populated places in the Sierra Nevada (United States)
Kern River Valley
Census-designated places in California